The Conference on College Composition and Communication (CCCC, often referred to as "Four Cs") is a national professional association of college and university writing instructors in the United States. The CCCC formed in 1949 as an organization within the National Council of Teachers of English (NCTE). CCCC is the largest organization dedicated to writing research, theory, and teaching worldwide.

Publications 
The CCCC currently publishes the following journals: College Composition and Communication, College Composition and Communication Online, the Studies in Writing and Rhetoric Series, and FORUM: Issues About Part-Time and Contingent Faculty. Previously, the CCCC also published Bibliography of Composition and Rhetoric, from 1984 to 1999.

College Composition and Communication (CCC) is a quarterly journal that seeks to promote scholarship, research, and the teaching of writing at the collegiate level. Back issues can be accessed through the CCCC website. The CCCC also publishes the College Composition and Communication Online (CCC Online) journal, which focuses on Web-based text and digital research, and their website offers the CCC Online Archive, a tool that can be used to search the CCC.

The CCCC co-publishes the Studies in Writing and Rhetoric (SWR) book series with WAC Clearinghouse, which focuses on researching the history of teaching and studying writing and rhetoric, as well as highlighting the diversity of the members involved in these communities.

FORUM: Issues About Part-Time and Contingent Faculty is published twice a year and can be found in CCC and Teaching English in the Two-Year College (TETYC). Publishing about the realities and perspectives of professionals involved in the field of college composition is the journal's focus.

From 1984 to 1999, the CCCC published Bibliography of Composition and Rhetoric. An archive to its content is linked to by the CCCC website and hosted on ibiblio.

Conferences

Annual convention 
CCCC holds an annual convention, which usually has over 3000 members in attendance. The location of the convention and convention chair changes from year to year. The convention is primarily made up of scholarly panels, featured speakers, committee meetings, special interest group meetings, and workshops. An additional part of the convention is the Research Network Forum (RNF) -- a round-table venue where novice and experienced researchers gather to present works-in-progress, discuss methodologies, and share possible future projects—which has been called the "unofficial mentoring arm of CCCC" as well as the Qualitative Research Network (QRN). In addition, the opening meeting of the convention usually features the CCCC Chair's Address, during which the convention chair addresses the entire assembly of participants, often articulating a vision of the field of rhetoric and composition.

Awards 
The convention is also the time when CCCC presents several yearly awards, including the Exemplar Award (which recognizes an individual who has served as an exemplar for the organization), Outstanding Book Award, Outstanding Teaching Award, Richard Braddock Award (for the most outstanding article in CCC), the Stonewall Service Award (which recognizes those who have consistently worked to improve the experiences of sexual and gender minorities within the organization and the profession), the James Berlin Memorial Outstanding Dissertation Award, Chair's Memorial Scholarship (for graduate students presenting at the convention), Writing Program Certificate of Excellence, in addition to several others, including a variety of awards supporting travel to the conference.

Prior conventions

Future conventions

2023 conference 
To be held February 15–18, 2023 in Chicago, Illinois.

2024 conference 

To be held April 3–6, 2024 in Spokane, Washington.

Mission 

The organization has the four following aims:

 sponsoring meetings and publishing scholarly materials for the exchange of knowledge about composition, composition pedagogy, and rhetoric
 supporting a wide range of research on composition, communication, and rhetoric by individuals of diverse ethnic and racial backgrounds
 working to enhance the conditions for learning and teaching college composition and to promote professional development
 acting as an advocate for the advancement of a holistic understanding of  language and literacy education

Position statements 
CCCC has published a number of position statements on writing, teaching of writing, and related issues. Emerging from committees within CCCC, the position statements seek to promote the CCCC goals and encourage best practices in writing pedagogy, language practices, research, literacy, professional development, and working conditions.
Recent statements include:
 CCCC Statement on Recent Violent Crimes against Asians, Asian Americans, and Pacific Islanders (March 2021)
 CCCC Statement on Violence at the Capitol on January 6, 2021 (January 2021)
 CCCC Black Technical and Professional Communication Position Statement with Resource Guide (September 2020)
 This Ain’t Another Statement! This is a DEMAND for Black Linguistic Justice! (July 2020)
 Position Statement on CCCC Standards for Ethical Conduct Regarding Sexual Violence, Sexual Harassment, and Workplace Bullying (November 2016, revised March 2020)

Committees 
The permanent CCCC executive committee oversees a number of temporarily constituted special interest committees. These committees are constituted for a 3-year period, after which the executive committee can reconstitute the committee for another term.

Initiatives 
The organization sponsors the CCCC Research Initiative, which provides funds to researchers working on datasets collected by the organization and its affiliates. Begun in 2004, the grant has provided means for various research projects, including the "Composition, Rhetoric, and Literacy—What We Know, What We Need to Know" project that ran from 2004 to 2007. In addition to providing grant support to individual and collective projects and promoting inter-institutional collaboration, the project is designed to "create a sustained research initiative to advance scholarship in composition and rhetoric".

CCCC, along with its parent organization, the National Council of Teachers of English, sponsors a number of initiatives on writing, including the National Day on Writing held annually on October 20, as well as the CCCC Wikipedia Initiative, which focuses on expanding Wikipedia's coverage of topics related to writing research and pedagogy, verifying that article content is based on reliable secondary sources, and revising and editing writing studies studies to improve their overall quality.

See also 
 Composition studies

References

External links 
 

Professional associations based in the United States
1949 establishments in the United States